Herbert Spencer Jennings (April 8, 1868 – April 14, 1947) was an American zoologist, geneticist, and eugenicist. His research helped demonstrate the link between physical and chemical stimulation and automatic responses in lower orders of animals.

Life
He was born in Tonica, Illinois, on April 8, 1868, the son of George Nelson Jennings and his wife Olive Taft Jenks.

He studied at the University of Michigan graduating BS in 1893 then Harvard University where he gained a further AM degree in 1895 and a PhD in 1896. In 1906 he began a long and illustrious career at Johns Hopkins University in Baltimore where he stayed until retirement in 1938. He married twice: firstly in 1898 to Louisa Burridge and secondly in 1939 to Lulu Plant.

He died in Santa Monica, California, on April 14, 1947. He is buried in Forest Lawn Memorial Park in Glendale.

Career
Tracy Sonneborn would later write:Jennings was so struck by the continued production of hereditarily diverse clones at conjugation, even after many successive inbreedings, that he undertook to examine the matter mathematically. As a result, general formulae for the results of diverse systems of mating were published in a series of papers between 1912 and 1917; these were one of the main seeds from which the whole field of mathematical genetics developed.
In 1924, Jennings published an article in Scientific Monthly on "Heredity and Environment" which was prescient for anticipating the double helix, and provocatively liberal for its comments on racial differences and American immigration policy.

Jennings was the recipient of the inaugural 1925 Leidy Award of the Academy of Natural Sciences of Philadelphia.

After complaints about the documentary titled The Hereditarily Diseased, the Carnegie Institution of Washington appointed Jennings to review the work of Harry H. Laughlin at the Institution's Eugenics Record Office, then part of what has become the Cold Spring Harbor Laboratory.  Jennings found falsified data and manipulated conclusions, and Laughlin was forced out. In 1930, he published The Biological Basis of Human Nature, discussing eugenics, genetic influence on human traits, and criticizing simplistic interpretations of heritability based on Mendelism, emphasizing gene-environment interaction & polygenicity; Sonneborn would describe the impact of The Biological Basis of Human Nature as widespread: "Probably no book by a geneticist has been so widely quoted by American workers in the fields of education, sociology, anthropology, and psychology. In spite of inevitable misquotation and misinterpretation, it has exercised a distinctly salutary effect on those fields and is to a large extent responsible for whatever they have assimilated in this country from modern genetics."

See also
 :Category:Taxa named by Herbert Spencer Jennings

References

Footnotes

External links 

 
 

1868 births
1947 deaths
American geneticists
American zoologists
Harvard University alumni
People from Tonica, Illinois
University of Michigan alumni